The Berneuse (or la Berneuse) is a mountain of the western Bernese Alps, above Leysin in the canton of Vaud. It lies on the range east of the Rhone valley, culminating at the Tour d'Aï.

Its summit (2,045 m) is a popular destination, hosting the Kuklos, a revolving restaurant  accessible by cable cabin from town. On a clear day, Lake Geneva is visible from this summit.

See also
List of mountains of Switzerland accessible by public transport

References

External links
 Leysin Tourist Office official website
 Berneuse on Hikr
 Website for hikers

Cable cars in Switzerland
Bernese Alps
Mountains of the Alps
Buildings and structures with revolving restaurants
Mountains of the canton of Vaud
Mountains of Switzerland